Raymond J. Seigfried (born August 23, 1950) is an American politician. He was a Democratic member of the Delaware House of Representatives, representing District 7, from 2018 to 2020.

Seigfried is a professor of healthcare policy and worked as a senior vice president for Christiana Care for over 25 years.

In 2018, Seigfried topped four other Democrats in the primary election to replace retiring Democrat Bryon Short, winning 762 votes (28.7%) in the five-way race. He won the general election with 5,943 votes (62.9%) against Republican nominee Eric Braunstein and Libertarian nominee Scott Gesty. Seigfried lived on the same street as Braunstein.

In 2020, Seigfried was defeated in the Democratic primary in a rematch with the 2018 primary runner-up, progressive Larry Lambert, by a 59%-41% margin.

References

External links
Official page at the Delaware General Assembly
Campaign site
 

1950 births
Living people
Democratic Party members of the Delaware House of Representatives
21st-century American politicians